The 2004–05 season was the 64th season in Albacete Balompié's history.

Squad
Retrieved on 28 December 2020

Transfers

In

Out

Squad stats 
Last updated on 29 December 2020.

|-
|colspan="14"|Players who have left the club after the start of the season:

|}

Competitions

Overall

La Liga

League table

Matches

Copa del Rey

References

Albacete Balompié seasons
Albacete Balompié